Robert M. 'Scotty' Whitelaw (1927 - April 2, 2016) was an American athlete, baseball and basketball coach and long serving Commissioner of the Eastern College Athletic Conference.
  	
Born in Quincy, Massachusetts, he played football and other sports for North Quincy High School and Springfield College.

In addition to serving as the ECAC Commissioner from 1971 to 1989, he also was the executive director of the National Invitation Tournament and baseball coach, basketball coach and assistant athletic director for MIT.

References

1927 births
2016 deaths
College men's basketball head coaches in the United States
College men's track and field athletes in the United States
Eastern College Athletic Conference commissioners
MIT Engineers baseball coaches
MIT Engineers men's basketball coaches
North Quincy High School alumni
Sportspeople from Quincy, Massachusetts
Springfield Pride baseball players
Springfield Pride football players